†Carelia knudseni was a species of small, air-breathing, land snails, terrestrial pulmonate gastropod mollusks in the family  Amastridae and superfamily Cochlicopoidea.

This species was endemic to the Hawaiian Islands before being recognised as extinct in 1990 by the IUCN.

References

Carelia (gastropod)
Extinct gastropods
Taxonomy articles created by Polbot